Boone Township is an inactive township in Franklin County, in the U.S. state of Missouri.

Boone Township was established in 1832, and named after Boone Creek.

References

Townships in Missouri
Townships in Franklin County, Missouri